Old Fire House No. 4 is a former fire station located at 526 North Burdick Street in Kalamazoo, Michigan. It was listed on the National Register of Historic Places in 1983.

History
As the north side of Kalamazoo grew in the late 1800s, there was a need for greater fire protection in that part of the city. In 1887, the city purchased land for a new station and hired local architect Martin W. Roberts to design a new station. Contractor Alexander Robbins of Kalamazoo constructed the station, and it was in use by the end of 1887. In 1901, a matching addition on one side of the station was constructed to house a new fire truck. The city used the station until 1956, when it was sold. In the 1980s it was used as a warehouse. It was later refurbished into office space. In 2009, "Rescued Treasures," a thrift store associated with the nearby Kalamazoo Gospel Mission, was constructed adjacent to the building.

Description
Old Fire House No. 4 Is a two-story brick Late Victorian structure; the original section is two bays wide. It has a pyramid-roof tower at one corner, and paneled brick detailing.

References

		
National Register of Historic Places in Kalamazoo County, Michigan
Victorian architecture in Michigan
Infrastructure completed in 1887